Stefan Henze (3 May 1981 – 15 August 2016) was a German slalom canoeist who competed at the international level from 1996 to 2011.

Career
Henze won a silver medal in the C2 event at the 2004 Summer Olympics in Athens.

He also won six medals at the ICF Canoe Slalom World Championships with a gold (C2: 2003), four silvers (C2: 2006, C2 team: 2003, 2006, 2009), and a bronze (C2: 2005). He won a gold and two silvers in the C2 team event at the European Championships.

His partner in the C2 boat throughout his career was Marcus Becker.

His father Jürgen Henze is world champion in the C2 team event from 1975 and his older brother Frank Henze is also a canoe slalom racer and multiple world championship medalist.

World Cup individual podiums

1 World Championship counting for World Cup points

Death
On 12 August 2016, Henze suffered serious head injuries after a car crash in Rio de Janeiro, where he coached during the 2016 Summer Olympics, and died three days later. Henze donated his organs. After he died, his heart, his liver and both of his kidneys were transplanted into seriously ill people in a hospital in Rio de Janeiro.

References

12 September 2009 final results for the men's C2 team slalom event for the 2009 ICF Canoe Slalom World Championships.- accessed 12 September 2009. 
DatabaseOlympics.com profile

OSI-Leipzig.de profile

1981 births
2016 deaths
Sportspeople from Halle (Saale)
People from Bezirk Halle
German male canoeists
Olympic canoeists of Germany
Canoeists at the 2004 Summer Olympics
Olympic silver medalists for Germany
Olympic medalists in canoeing
Medalists at the 2004 Summer Olympics
Medalists at the ICF Canoe Slalom World Championships
Recipients of the Silver Laurel Leaf
Olympic deaths
Road incident deaths in Brazil